MLL may refer to:

 Major League Lacrosse
 Malua Bay language (ISO 639-3: mll), spoken in Malekula, Vanuatu
 Marshall Don Hunter Sr. Airport (IATA: MLL), in Marshall, Alaska
 Mayor Lori Lightfoot, mayor of Chicago
 Morel-Lavallée lesion
 An enzyme encoded by the KMT2A gene